"Acquiesce" is a song by English rock band Oasis, written by Noel Gallagher. The song originally appeared as the B-side to Oasis' first UK number-one single, "Some Might Say", in 1995. Its popularity led to it being included on the B-sides compilation album The Masterplan, released in 1998, after being voted for inclusion by fans of the band on their official website.

In October 1998, the song was issued as a radio single in North America to promote the release of The Masterplan. It reached number 24 on the US Billboard Modern Rock Tracks chart, number 20 on the Canadian RPM Alternative 30, and number 44 on the RPM Top Singles chart.

"Acquiesce" was also released as one of the lead tracks to the Stop the Clocks EP, in promotion of their compilation album of which it also appears on, Stop the Clocks. The verses to "Acquiesce" are sung by Liam Gallagher, with the chorus sung by Noel (because, he claims, Liam could not reach the high notes).

History
Noel Gallagher claims to have written the lyrics to "Acquiesce" on the way to the studio for the recording sessions of Definitely Maybe. The train was delayed, and during this interruption, he wrote parts of the song. According to The Masterplans sleeve notes (written by music writer and critic Paul Du Noyer), "The song is about friendship in the widest sense and not, as often speculated, about the Gallagher brothers themselves."

"Acquiesce" became a fan favourite and was regularly played live. Many Oasis fans feel this song should have been held back to go on the (What's the Story) Morning Glory? album, with others also feeling the song was strong enough to have been released as a single. This was an opinion that Alan McGee had when he first heard the song; he tried to convince Noel to release "Acquiesce" as a single instead of "Some Might Say". Noel rejected this idea because he was adamant that the work on the single was completed, and was unwilling to have to write another B-side and record it. However, Noel has since said that this and a couple of other songs such as "The Masterplan" were strong enough to have been album tracks and singles.

The studio recording of the song features clips of an acoustic version of another Oasis song, "Morning Glory". This is heard at the beginning and at the end of the song. Also, over the distortion and guitars of the intro, a conversation between Liam and two anonymous voices (which are believed to be of co-producer Owen Morris and rhythm guitarist Bonehead) can be heard, played in reverse. Played correctly, the conversation goes:

Owen: Where's Noel?
Liam: Gone for a walk
Bonehead: Sacked him
Owen: Alright
Liam: I've sacked him

In 1997 it was performed by the band when they were the musical guest to host Matthew Perry on Saturday Night Live

The song is featured in the episode "The Day Before" (season 1, episode 12) of the television show Jericho, in the movie Goal!, and has been covered by bands such as the Killers, Good Charlotte and Third Eye Blind.

Music videos
There are two music videos for this single.

The first video was the live performance at the G-Mex Centre in Manchester, on 14 December 1997. The vocals on this footage were overdubbed from another performance.

The second video was filmed at the Electric Ballroom in Camden, London, on 12 September 2006, but did not feature the band. Instead, a Japanese look-alike/tribute band played the roles of Oasis. More footage is also understood to have been filmed in Japan, mirroring the idea featured in R.E.M.'s 1995 video for "Crush with Eyeliner".

Personnel
 Liam Gallagher – lead vocals (verses), tambourine
 Noel Gallagher – lead guitars, lead vocals (choruses)
 Paul Arthurs – rhythm guitar
 Paul McGuigan – bass
 Tony McCarroll – drums

Charts

Certifications

References

External links
 Wiktionary: acquiesce

Oasis (band) songs
1995 songs
1998 singles
Music videos directed by Robert Hales
Song recordings produced by Noel Gallagher
Songs written by Noel Gallagher